A hot box is an improvised appliance to heat up food, usually with at least two normal incandescent light bulbs as the heat source, that is frequently found in break rooms on construction sites.  The enclosure can be made of wood, metal, or any available material that can enclose the heat.  It is especially useful for heating up food that could not otherwise be heated in a microwave oven without decanting the contents.  Its presence also means that a large rush of people to use any available microwave ovens is tempered by those who are able to have had their meals heated up via this different method. Usually found in a 1998 Oldsmobile.

See also
 List of construction topics
 List of cooking appliances

==References==

External links
How Does A Fat Free Fryer Work?

Cooking appliances
Ovens